Calcutta Business School (CBS) is a business school near Kolkata, India. This college is an autonomous institute. The Post Graduate Diploma in Management (PGDM) program of this college is approved by AICTE. It received "Asia's fastest growing private educational institute" award in 2014.

History
The college was founded in 1920 by Shikshayatan Foundation (formerly Marwari Balika Vidyalaya Society).

Board of Governors
Mr. S. K. Birla, Birla Brothers, Chairman, Director
Mr. R. N. Jhunjhunwala, Attorney-at-Law, Khaitan and Company, Senior Partner
Mr. B. D. Bose, Birla Brothers, Chairman, Director.
Dr. Subir Chowdhury, Former Director, IIM Calcutta.
Mr. R. S. Jhawar, Director, Williamson Magor Group.

Academics

Courses
 Post Graduate Diploma in Management (PGDM)
 Certificate Course In General Management

Infrastructure
Management Development & Research Cell
licensed IT software and databases
Data Centre
Gymnasium
Administrative Block
Academic Block
Hostel
Medical Centre
Transportation

Events

National Conference On Advances In Business Research And Management Practices
National E-Summit
One Day Workshop on "Technical Content Writing Using LaTeX", 29 May 2016 
Management Development Programme on Data Analytics in Supply Chain and Retail Operations
One Week Faculty Development Programme (FDP), Technically Sponsored by Computer Society of India, Kolkata Chapter.
A Five-day Fully Residential Management Development Programme.
 International Conference on Computational Intelligence, Communications, and Business Analytics (CICBA-2017)

Collaboration

 memorandum of understanding (MOU) with The Bengal Chamber of Commerce & Industry in the field of education and training.
Tie up with Statistical Analysis System to meet the demand of data scientist.
Calcutta Business School in pact with SAS for certificate course.

Committee

 Accreditation Committee
 Admissions Committee
 SIP/Placements Committee
 ConvocationCommittee
 International Engagement Committee
 IT Committee
 Faculty/Management Development ProgramLibrary Committee
 Conference & Publications Committee

References

Business schools in Kolkata
Universities and colleges in South 24 Parganas district
1920 establishments in India